Don Peters is a former American gymnastics coach and head coach of the United States women's gymnastics team at the 1984 Summer Olympics. He was hired as head coach SCATS Gymnastics, a gymnastics club in Huntington Beach, California.

In 2011, Peters was banned for life by USA Gymnastics after allegations surfaced that he had sexually assaulted three teenage gymnasts.

Sources 
 Gymnasts accuse renowned coach of sex abuse, Published: September 23, 2011, Updated: March 16, 2012, 5:22 p.m., by SCOTT M. REID / THE ORANGE COUNTY REGISTER
 Don Peters, Gymnastics Coach, Banned From Olympics After Sexual Abuse Accusations, The Huffington Post, November 16, 2011
 Olympic Gymnastics Coach Banned for Life After Sex Abuse Allegations, KTLA News, 6:09 p.m. PST, November 16, 2011

External links 
 Don Peters profile on SCATS website (Archived version from January 2011)

Living people
American gymnastics coaches
Year of birth missing (living people)